Filippo Terzi (1520–1597) was an Italian military and civil architect and engineer, born in Bologna, who went to Lisbon in 1577 and the following year joined the disastrous military expedition to Morocco where he was taken prisoner at the Battle of Alcácer Quibir, after which his release was negotiated and he returned to Portugal, where he spent the remainder of his career, dying at Setúbal.

In 1582 Philip II of Spain, recently declared king also of Portugal, visited
Setúbal, where Terzi was recommended to him on the occasion of a new fortification needed to reinforce the security of that port city. Having achieved the work successfully, Terzi was named master of work at the Convento de Cristo in Tomar, in 1584.

In 1590, he was named  Mestre das Obras de el-Rei, "Master of the King's works", succeeding the post that had been occupied by António Rodrigues. Terzi was also charged with the instruction of a new generation of young architects in the Royal Works. He was responsible for numerous projects, notably at Coimbra and Lisbon, including the aqueduct that led from São Sebastião to Coimbra.

Selected works
Convento de Cristo, Tomar: cloister
church of São Vincente de Fora, Lisbon (1582–1605)
 Fort of Pessegueiro (1588–90), a coastal fortress in which the island of Pessegueiro was linked to the mainland
 Fort of Santiago da Barra in Monserrate (Viana do Castelo)
 Fort of São Filipe de Setúbal (1597) was in progress when he died.
 Igreja de São Roque (Lisbon) (Church of São Roque); completed the construction, including the roof

Notes

1520 births
1597 deaths
16th-century Italian architects
Portuguese architects
Architects from Bologna
Engineers from Bologna

Portuguese people of Italian descent